Paulescu is a patronymic surname of Romanian origin. Notable people with the surname include:

 Nicolae Paulescu (1869–1931), Romanian physiologist and discoverer of insulin
 Sam Paulescu (born 1984), American football punter

Romanian-language surnames
Surnames from given names